Rest of My Life or The Rest of My Life may refer to:

Songs
 "Rest of My Life" (Ludacris song), 2012
 "Rest of My Life" (Unwritten Law song), 2003
 "The Rest of My Life" (Prince song), 1999
 "The Rest of My Life" (Sloan song), 2003
 "Rest of My Life", a song by Kottonmouth Kings from Rollin' Stoned, 2002
 "Rest of My Life", a song by Racey
 "The Rest of My Life", a song by Cheap Trick from We're All Alright!
 "The Rest of My Life", a song by Less Than Jake from In with the Out Crowd

Television
 The Rest of My Life: Degrassi Takes Manhattan, a 2010 Canadian television film concluding season 9 of Degrassi: The Next Generation

See also
 Tonight and the Rest of My Life, an album by Nina Gordon